Pseudobufo (or Suck Toad) is a monotypic genus of toads in the family Bufonidae. It is represented by a single species, Pseudobufo subasper.
It is found in Indonesia and Malaysia.
Its natural habitats are subtropical or tropical swamps and swamps.
It is threatened by habitat loss and caught for the wildlife pet trade in Indonesia.
This toad can only be found in peat swamps. They have fully webbed hind feet and are closely associated with water.

References

External links
 
 Amphibian and Reptiles of Peninsular Malaysia - Pseudobufo subasper

Bufonidae
Amphibians described in 1838
Monotypic amphibian genera
Taxa named by Johann Jakob von Tschudi
Taxonomy articles created by Polbot